Pozzo may refer to:
 Pozzo (surname), Italian surname
 Pozzo (Waiting for Godot), a character from the play Waiting for Godot
 Pozzo d'Adda, comune in the Province of Milan in the Italian region Lombardy
 Pozzo Ardizzi, Italian surname and family